Unterer Wehrbach is of small river in the Englischer Garten, a public park in Munich, Bavaria, Germany. It branches off the Oberstjägermeisterbach and flows into the Isar.

See also
List of rivers of Bavaria

References

Rivers of Bavaria
Rivers of Germany